A list of films produced in Brazil in 1980:

See also
1980 in Brazil
1980 in Brazilian television

References

External links
Brazilian films of 1980 at the Internet Movie Database

Brazil
1980
Films